(), also known as  in the Song dynasty, , , , is a type of ancient Chinese corset-like garment item, which is typically used as an undergarment or decorative over-garment accessory in . It originated from the Tang dynasty and its origin is attributed to the Tang dynasty imperial consort, Yang Guifei. The  became popular from the Tang to Ming dynasties. This garment item accessory bears resemblance to the Qing dynasty  but do not have the same construction and design.

Origins 

This is also attested by Song Gaozhen in the :  – 《》. The  then became popular as women in the palace imitated the trend of Yang Guifei.

In the Ming dynasty records 《》by Ming dynasty scholar Tian Yiheng , it is mentioned that the ", that is, Tang '' and so on ...... from the back and surrounded by forward, so also named ".

Construction and design 

It is suggested that the Tang dynasty  wrapped the breasts and the back areas of women. However, to date, there is a lack of unearthed archaeological artifact of the  dating from the Tang dynasty. The painting "Court Ladies Adorning Their Hair with Flowers" by the 8th century painter, Zhou Fang, of the Tang dynasty was used as the main reference to recover the  nowadays. 

On the other hand, there are archaeological artifacts of the Song dynasty  which was unearthed in Fujian Province. The  in the Song dynasty was a single-piece garment which was used as an underwear, but appears to have been more conservative in style as it covered both the breasts and belly areas of its wearer.

Modern  
However, due to the lack of unearthed archaeological artifacts, this form of Tang dynasty  with side ties as a stand-alone accessory item was discontinued by  merchants. 

Modern  
The   features box pleats; it is actually a 21st century invention and did not exist in the Song dynasty; its creation and development was the result of restoration mistakes by early  merchants when attempting to restore the Song dynasty cultural relics of the actual clothing item. It, however, continues to be sold in the current  market. A special style of Song dynasty-style  which is currently produced is a backless , which was designed in imitation to the  artifacts unearthed from the tomb of Huang Sheng dating in the Southern Song dynasty.

See also 

 
 Hanfu accessories

Notes

References

External links 

Chinese traditional clothing